WMMJ (102.3 FM), known on air as "Majic 102.3 & 92.7," is a jammin' oldies-leaning urban adult contemporary radio station owned by Radio One in the Washington, D.C. market.  It is co-owned with WKYS, WOL, WPRS-FM and WYCB and has studios located in Silver Spring, Maryland.  It is licensed to Bethesda, but its transmitter is located in Tenleytown. During the 1960s, '70s and early '80s, the station had been home to the original "progressive rock" formatted WHFS, which later migrated to the higher powered Annapolis, Maryland-based 99.1 frequency.

WMMJ simulcasts on WDCJ (92.7 FM, Prince Frederick, Maryland) for the southeastern counties of the Washington metro.

WMMJ broadcasts in the HD format.

History
In 1987, Cathy Hughes purchased WMMJ and changed the format from easy listening to Urban Oldies as Majic 102. The station has basically maintained this format for 20 years with it skewing its format more toward the 25-54 demographic as an Urban Adult Contemporary. Majic has consistently been one of the market's leaders, delivering Washington's most loyal audience. In 1999, WMMJ acquired the syndication rights of the Tom Joyner Morning Show from rival Urban AC WHUR-FM. In the summer of 2008, it also became home to Mo'Nique in the afternoon until March 18, 2009, when Mo'Nique decided leave to "further her career in television, film, and comedy".

On June 23, 2010, WMMJ's live airstaff were let go in a surprise shakeup, despite the station posting its best numbers in the Washington Arbitrons. The shakeup began in April 2010, when its GM and PD were let go. WMMJ hired former WHUR morning man John Monds to be the new afternoon drive personality from 3 to 7 PM and Courtney Hicks as the new midday personality from 10 AM to 3 PM. Michel Wright has since replaced Courtney Hicks in Middays, and Adimu replaced John Monds in afternoon drive, and finally Donnie Simpson replaced Adimu, all formerly of WPGC (except John Monds). Monds was moved into the 7P.M.-midnight timeslot.

Since the airstaff change, the playlist has been steadily leaning toward a Jammin' Oldies direction due to declining ratings; however, the actual format still remains on the Urban AC side of the line.

On August 3, 2015, WMMJ announced their new slogan as The Real Sound of the DMV, and also made a surprise announcement that Donnie Simpson will return to the airwaves after retiring from his morning show on WPGC-FM in January 2010. The Donnie Simpson Show returned on August 17, 2015, and airs Monday thru Friday from 3-7P.M. (ET). In January 2016, Russ Parr moved over from sister station WKYS to WMMJ to replace Tom Joyner after 17 years on the station.

To bolster coverage in the southern and eastern portions of the Washington market, Radio One purchased WWXT (now WDCJ) from Red Zebra Broadcasting. WDCJ began simulcasting WMMJ on May 1, 2017.

References

External links
Official Website of Majic 102.3

African-American history of Washington, D.C.
Urban One stations
Radio stations established in 1961
MMJ
Urban adult contemporary radio stations in the United States